Since 1940, Turkey has frequently been under extraordinary rule, either the whole of the country or specific provinces. According to Articles 119-122 of the 1982 Constitution the four types of extraordinary rule are martial law (sıkıyönetim), state of emergency (olağanüstü hâl, OHAL), mobilization (seferberlik) and situation of war (savaş hâli). Martial law has been abolished and all other forms have been merged into single form of state of emergency since 2017 amendment to Turkish constitution.

History
On 27 December 2001 constitutional law professor Dr. Zafer Üskül presented some details in the daily Radikal. The first law passed in 1940 was called law on extraordinary administration (İdare-i Örfiye Kanunu). It was replaced in 1971 by Martial Law. The first law on state of emergency, mobilization and war was passed under military rule in 1983.

Legal background
Article 119 of Turkish constitution regulates state of emergency.

Imposition of martial law
At the end of 2001 law professor Dr. Zafer Üskül stated that 40 of its 78 years the Republic of Turkey had, in some or other part of it, been under extraordinary rule. In December 1978 martial law was imposed in 13 provinces in response to violent incidents in Kahramanmaraş. During the nine months after the Kahramanmaraş riots the government extended martial law to cover 20 provinces. When the military seized power on 12 September 1980 the five generals of the General Staff announced martial law in all of the existing 67 provinces of Turkey. From December 1983 military rule was gradually withdrawn. It was finally lifted throughout Turkey in July 1987. 

On 1 July 1982 five states (Denmark, Norway, Sweden, France and the Netherlands) filed an application against Turkey with the European Commission of Human Rights. In December 1985 a friendly settlement was reached that demanded that Turkey should lift martial law within 18 months. Turkey did as requested, only to replace martial law by emergency legislation.

State of emergency

See also
 State of emergency
 Martial law
 1960 Turkish coup d'état
 1971 Turkish coup d'état
 1980 Turkish coup d'état
 Kurdish–Turkish conflict
Inspectorates-General

References

Government of Turkey
Turkey
Law of Turkey